Deguchi (written 出口 lit. "exit") is a Japanese surname. Notable people with the surname include:

, Japanese singer and idol
Christa Deguchi (出口 クリスタ, born 1995) is a Canadian judoka.
, Japanese golfer
, Japanese sport wrestler
, Japanese voice actress
, Japanese religious leader and founder of Oomoto
, Japanese religious leader
Tetsujyo Deguchi (born 1950), Japanese Zen Buddhist
, Japanese baseball player

Japanese-language surnames